Prairie Dog Town Fork Red River is a sandy-braided stream about  long, formed at the confluence of Palo Duro Creek and Tierra Blanca Creek, about  northeast of Canyon in Randall County, Texas, and flowing east-southeastward to the Red River about  east of the 100th meridian,  south-southwest of Hollis, Oklahoma.

Geography
The Prairie Dog Town Fork Red River is the southernmost of two major forks which form the headwaters of the Red River. The stream initially runs northeastward then southeastward across Randall County, flowing through Palo Duro Canyon, where it is fed by springs, providing a base flow that is often increased significantly by runoff from rainstorms. It provides the water for Lake Tanglewood and River Falls prior to flowing through the Palo Duro Canyon State Park. The stream continues in a southeasterly direction through southern Armstrong and northeastern Briscoe County, where it exits Palo Duro Canyon and starts across the rolling red-bed country of central Hall County, where it merges with the Little Red River. When the Prairie Dog Town Fork crosses the 100th meridian at the eastern edge of Childress County, its south bank becomes the state boundary between Texas and Oklahoma.

Proper name
According to a 1959 decision by the United States Board on Geographical Names, this main tributary of the Red River is properly called the Prairie Dog Town Fork Red River, and should not be called the Prairie Dog Town Fork of the Red River, Prairie Dog Town Fork of Red River, or the South Fork of the Red River.

See also
Adams–Onís Treaty
Double Mountain Fork Brazos River
Little Red River (Texas)
Llano Estacado
Washita River
Palo Duro Canyon
Pease River
Salt Fork Red River
List of rivers of Texas

References

External links

Rivers of Oklahoma
Rivers of Texas
Tributaries of the Red River of the South
Rivers of Randall County, Texas
Rivers of Armstrong County, Texas
Rivers of Briscoe County, Texas
Rivers of Hall County, Texas
Rivers of Childress County, Texas
Rivers of Harmon County, Oklahoma